Xou da Xuxa 3 is the fourth studio album by Brazilian pop singer, TV host and actress Xuxa. It was released on June 30, 1988 by Som Livre. It is the most successful album released throughout her career, selling about 3 million and 216 thousand copies. It is the second best-selling album in Brazil, behind only the album Músicas para Louvar o Senhor (1998), by Father Marcelo Rossi, who sold about 3 million and 228 thousand copies. Thus, Xou da Xuxa 3 is the best selling album in Brazilian history by a female artist.

The album, which featured hits like "Arco-íris", "Abecedário da Xuxa", "Brincar de Índio" and especially "Ilariê" that became the most famous song of Xuxa until today, became the most expressive album in Latin American sales at the time. The song "Ilariê" was in 1st place for 20 weeks in the Brazilian charts, being the most performed song in the radios along with "Faz Parte do Meu Show" of Cazuza. According to Jornal do Brasil, with data from Nelson Oliveira Pesquisas de Mercado, at the time the album reached number one on the list of best selling albums.

Background and production
A children's programs most successful Brazilian television history, the Xou da Xuxa was a game show hosted by Xuxa. His first appearance as host of TV was in the Clube da Criança, directed by Maurice Sherman in 1983 in Rede Manchete. Sherman was responsible for the discovery of Xuxa on television.

Since their first LP in Som Livre, Xou da Xuxa of 1986, presenter and now singer became a phonograph phenomenon. At Christmas 1986, Xuxa received his eighth Platinum record, award granted every 250,000 copies sold in Brazil. The album hit the mark more than two million copies, reaching the South American record sales.

Xou da Xuxa 3 was produced by Michael Sullivan, Paulo Massadas, with Max Pierre's artistic coordination, Xuxa's album Xuxa 3 was recorded at the SIGLA (Som Livre) studios and the LP was manufactured by BMG Ariola (RCA Records).

The process of selecting the songs was mandated by the screening of Xuxa's manager, Marlene Mattos, who listened to about 200 compositions sent from all over the country before separating 16. After playing these songs on TV Globo's show and receiving the opinion of students of public schools in the form of notes, Xou da Xuxa 3 left with 14 songs among them "Arco-iris", theme of the film Super Xuxa Contra Baixo Astral, "Ilariê", its greater commercial success, and "Brincar de Índio" besides the "Abecedário da Xuxa", specially recorded to play on the TV for the deaf and dumb.

Release
Xou da Xuxa 3 was released on June 30, 1988 by Som Livre, in CD, cassette and LP formats. The album was the first of Xuxa to be released on CD, and was reissued on CD in 1989 in Israel, reissued on CD and cassette in Brazil in 1996, and on CD in 2006. In 2013, Som Livre in partnership with Xuxa Productions, launched Xou's collection of Xuxa + Untitled CD Fans Selection, a box with all 7 albums released at the time of the program, and with it a CD with unpublished songs, chosen by fans of the hostess.

Commercial performance
Xou da Xuxa 3 release, Xuxa has once again become a big seller of albums throughout Brazil, the album has become the most successful of its career, selling more than 3,216,000 copies to the present day. According to the Jornal do Brasil, with data from NOPEM (Nelson Oliveira Market Research), during its release the album reached number one on the list of best selling albums. Brazil's second best seller, just a few seconds behind Músicas para Louvar o Senhor of Father Marcelo Rossi.

"Ilariê" became the most played song in the Brazilian radio in 1988, being 20 consecutive weeks at the top of the charts, being the most performed song in the radios along with "Faz Parte do Meu Show" of Cazuza.

Legacy
The album entered the Book of Records as the best-selling children's record of all time, is the best seller of his career and the second best seller in Brazil and also the best-selling album by a solo artist for children around the world. The album was considered the best seller in the history of country until the released Músicas para Louvar o Senhor (1998), of Father Marcelo Rossi. which sold about 3 million and 228 thousand copies, being the best selling album by a female artist solo in Brazil and is also the best selling album in the history of the record company Som Livre. established itself as the most expressive album in Latin American sales at the time.

"Ilariê" has been recorded in 80 dialects over the years, the English and Spanish language version being Xuxa itself, as well as a Chinese version interpreted by the Taiwanese trio i.n.g in 2006 as "健 健美".

Track listing

Personnel
Produced by: Michael Sullivan and Paulo Massdas
Artistic coordination: Max Pierre
Recording and mixing engineer: Jorge "Gordo" Guimarães
Additional engineers (Free Sound): Luiz Paulo, Edu, D'Orey, Mario Jorge and Beto Vaz (studio Mix) Andy Mills, João Damasceno and Paulo Henrique
Studio Assistants (Sound Free): Sergio Rocha, Ivan Carvalho, Marcelo, Serodio, Marquinhos, Cezar Barbosa, Billy, Octavio "Chambinho", Alexandre Ribas, Julio Martins, Julio Carneiro, Claudio Oliveira, Marcos André, Loba and Marcio Barros
Regimentation: Jorge CorreaEdition - Ieddo Gouvea
Back Vocals: The Paquitas (Ana Paula Guimarães, Anna Paula Almeida, Priscila Couto, Tatiana Maranhão, Roberta Cipriani, Andréia Faria, Louise Wischermann)

Certifications and sales

See also 
 List of best-selling albums in Brazil
List of best-selling Latin albums

References

External links 
 Xou da Xuxa 3 at Discogs

1988 albums
Xuxa albums
Som Livre albums
Children's music albums by Brazilian artists
Portuguese-language albums